The 1991–92 Liga Leumit season began in 1991 and ended in 1992, with Maccabi Tel Aviv winning their 15th title and qualifying for the Champions League as Israel's first representative in the competition.

Regular season

Table

Results

Playoffs

Top playoff

Table

Results

Bottom playoff

Table

Results

References
Israel - List of Final Tables RSSSF

Liga Leumit seasons
Israel
1